Kamil Sieradzki (born 11 January 2002) is a Polish swimmer. He competed in the men's 4 × 200 metre freestyle relay at the 2020 Summer Olympics.

References

External links
 

2002 births
Living people
Polish male freestyle swimmers
Olympic swimmers of Poland
Swimmers at the 2020 Summer Olympics
Place of birth missing (living people)
21st-century Polish people